This is a list of defunct airlines of North and South America.

Anguilla

Antigua and Barbuda

Archipelago of San Andrés, Providencia and Santa Catalina
Archipelago of San Andrés, Providencia and Santa Catalina has no listed defunct airlines.

Argentina

Aruba

Bahamas

Barbados

Belize
Defunct airlines of Belize include:

Bermuda
Defunct airlines of Bermuda include:

Bolivia

Bonaire

Bouvet Island
Bouvet Island has no listed defunct airlines.

Brazil

British Virgin Islands

Canada

Cayman Islands
Defunct airlines of the Cayman Islands include:

Chile

Clipperton Island
Clipperton Island has no listed defunct airlines.

Colombia

Costa Rica

Cuba
Defunct airlines of Cuba include:

Curaçao

Dominica
Dominica has no listed defunct airlines.

Dominican Republic

Dutch Caribbean

Ecuador

El Salvador

Falkland Islands
The Falkland Islands has no listed defunct airlines.

Federal Dependencies of Venezuela
The Federal Dependencies of Venezuela has no listed defunct airlines.

French Guiana
French Guiana has no listed defunct airlines.

Grenada

Greenland

Guadeloupe
Defunct airlines of Guadeloupe include:

Guatemala

Guyana
Defunct airlines of Guyana include:

Haiti

Honduras

Jamaica

Martinique
Defunct airlines of Martinique include:

Mexico

Montserrat
Defunct airlines of Montserrat include:

Navassa Island
Navassa Island has no listed defunct airlines.

Netherlands Antilles

Nicaragua

Nueva Esparta
Nueva Esparta has no listed defunct airlines.

Panama

Paraguay

Peru

Puerto Rico

Saba

Saint Barthélemy
Saint Barthélemy has no listed defunct airlines.

Saint Kitts and Nevis
Defunct airlines of Saint Kitts and Nevis include:

Saint Lucia
Defunct airlines of Saint Lucia include:

Saint Martin
Saint Martin has no listed defunct airlines.

Saint Pierre and Miquelon
Saint Pierre and Miquelon has no listed defunct airlines.

Saint Vincent and the Grenadines
Saint Vincent and the Grenadines has no listed defunct airlines.

Saint Maarten

Sint Eustatius

Sint Maarten

South Georgia and the South Sandwich Islands
South Georgia and the South Sandwich Islands has no listed defunct airlines.

Suriname

Trinidad and Tobago

Turks and Caicos Islands
Defunct airlines of the Turks and Caicos Islands include:

United States

Uruguay

U.S. Virgin Islands

Venezuela

See also
 List of airlines of North America

References

 Defunct
Americas